Fulham East was a constituency used for elections to the London County Council between 1919 and 1955.  The seat shared boundaries with the UK Parliament constituency of the same name.  It was largely replaced by a new Fulham constituency.

Councillors

Election results

References

London County Council constituencies
Politics of the London Borough of Hammersmith and Fulham
Fulham